Castle Howard is a stately home in North Yorkshire, England, within the civil parish of Henderskelfe, located  north of York. It is a private residence and has been the home of the Carlisle branch of the Howard family for more than 300 years. Castle Howard is not a fortified structure, but the term "castle" is sometimes used in the name of an English country house that was built on the site of a former castle.

The house is familiar to television and film audiences as the fictional "Brideshead", both in Granada Television's 1981 adaptation of Evelyn Waugh's Brideshead Revisited and in a two-hour 2008 adaptation for cinema.

History
In 1577, the 4th Duke of Norfolk's third son, Lord William Howard, married his step-sister Elizabeth Dacre, youngest daughter of the 4th Baron Dacre. She brought with her the sizable estates of Henderskelfe in Yorkshire and Naworth Castle in what was then Cumberland, now Cumbria.

Castle Howard was commissioned by the 3rd Earl of Carlisle, who was a male-line descendant of Lord William Howard. The site selected was part of the Henderskelfe estate. The creation of Castle Howard, began in 1699, with the start of design work by John Vanbrugh. It was completed with the decoration of the Long Gallery in 1811.

The estate was served by its own railway station, Castle Howard station, from 1845 to the 1950s.

While attending Girton College during the early Edwardian era, Lady Dorothy Georgiana Howard, the daughter of the 9th Earl and "Radical Countess" of Carlisle, befriended six of her fellow students, including the future archaeologist Gisela Richter and future candidate for Roman Catholic Sainthood Anna Abrikosova. All six were invited by Lady Dorothy to Castle Howard as guests during holidays.

After the death of the 9th Earl in 1911, Castle Howard was inherited by his fifth son, Geoffrey Howard, with later earls having Naworth Castle as their northern country house. Henry 'Chips' Channon, the diarist and future Conservative MP, visited Castle Howard in August 1923 and recounted in his diary that 'The house is uncomfortable in the extreme and is badly kept up. Everywhere there are signs of decaying magnificence.' Channon added that 'The galleries are reminiscent of the Vatican with their hundreds of busts and statues of emperors and gods. The great library is an enormous narrow red room the length of the house and is hung with enough paintings to found a museum.' 

In 1952, Castle Howard was opened to the public by its then-owner, Lord Howard of Henderskelfe, a younger son of Geoffrey Howard. It is now owned by a Howard family company, Castle Howard Estate Limited, and managed by the Hon. Nicholas Howard (the second son of Lord Howard of Henderskelfe) and his wife, Victoria.

House

The 3rd Earl of Carlisle first spoke to William Talman, a leading architect, but commissioned Vanbrugh, a fellow member of the Kit-Cat Club, to design the building. Castle Howard was that gentleman-dilettante's first foray into architecture, but he was assisted by Nicholas Hawksmoor.

Vanbrugh's design evolved into a Baroque structure with two symmetrical wings projecting to either side of a north–south axis. The crowning central dome was added to the design at a late stage, after building had begun. Construction began at the east end, with the East Wing constructed from 1701 to 1703, the east end of the Garden Front from 1701 to 1706, the Central Block (including dome) from 1703 to 1706, and the west end of the Garden Front from 1707 to 1709. All are exuberantly decorated in Baroque style, with coronets, cherubs, urns and cyphers, with Roman Doric pilasters on the north front and Corinthian on the south. Many interiors were decorated by Giovanni Antonio Pellegrini.

The Earl then turned his energies to the surrounding garden and grounds. Although the complete design is shown in the third volume of Colen Campbell's Vitruvius Britannicus, published in 1725, the West Wing was not yet started when Vanbrugh died in 1726, despite his remonstration with the Earl. The house remained incomplete on the death of the 3rd Earl in 1738, but the remaining construction finally started at the direction of the 4th Earl. However, Vanbrugh's design was not completed: the West Wing was built in a contrasting Palladian style to a design by the 3rd Earl's son-in-law, Sir Thomas Robinson. The new wing remained incomplete, with no first floor or roof, at the death of the 4th Earl in 1758; although a roof had been added, the interior remained undecorated by the death of Robinson in 1777. Rooms were completed stage by stage over the following decades, but the whole was not completed until 1811 under Charles Heathcote Tatham.

A large part of the house was destroyed by a fire which broke out on 9 November 1940. The dome, the central hall, the dining room and the state rooms on the east side were entirely destroyed. Antonio Pellegrini's ceiling decoration, the Fall of Phaeton, was lost when the dome collapsed. In total, twenty pictures (including two Tintorettos) and several valuable mirrors were lost. The fire took the Malton and York Fire Brigades eight hours to bring under control.

Some of the devastated rooms have been restored over the following decades. In 1960–61 the dome was rebuilt, and in the following couple of years Pellegrini's Fall of Phaeton was recreated on the underside of the dome. The East Wing remains a shell, although it has been re-roofed.

In 2009 an underwater ground-source heat recovery system was installed under the castle's lake that halved the heating bill.

According to figures released by the Association of Leading Visitor Attractions, over 269,000 people visited Castle Howard in 2019.

In 2023, Great British Bake Off star Freya Cox collaborated with head chef Nathan Richardson-Kelly to create three seasonal vegan cakes for the castle Coffee Shop and Courtyard Café. The first cake, launched in January, is a vegan Black Forest Gateau. Cakes for spring and autumn were also planned and will be announced later in the year.

Gardens
 
Castle Howard has extensive and diverse gardens. There is a large formal garden immediately behind (i.e., on the south side of) the house. The house is prominently situated on a ridge and this was exploited in the development of an English landscape park, which adjoins and opens out from the formal garden. The gardens are Grade I listed on the National Register of Historic Parks and Gardens.

Two major garden buildings are set in this landscape: the Temple of the Four Winds at the end of the garden, and the Mausoleum in the park. There is also a lake on either side of the house. There is a woodland garden, Ray Wood (formerly Wray Wood), immediately east of the house, and a walled garden which contains decorative rose and flower gardens. The Ray Wood walls date from the 18th century and were restored in 2007.
Further buildings outside the preserved gardens include Nicholas Hawksmoor's Pyramid, restored in 2015, an obelisk, and several follies and eyecatchers in the form of fortifications which have been restored in recent years. In nearby Pretty Wood, there are two more monuments, The Four Faces and a smaller pyramid by Hawksmoor.

Located on the estate, but operating separately from the house and gardens and run by an entirely independent charitable trust, is the  Yorkshire Arboretum.

Listed status
The house is Grade I listed and there are many other listed structures on the estate, several of which are on the Heritage at Risk Register.

Castle Howard as film location 
Castle Howard appeared in film as Brideshead in both the 1981 television serial and 2008 film adaptations of Evelyn Waugh's novel Brideshead Revisited.

It featured in Peter Ustinov's 1965 film Lady L and it appeared as the Kremlin, in Galton and Simpson's 1966 film The Spy with a Cold Nose. It was then used as the exterior set for Lady Lyndon's estate in Stanley Kubrick's 1975 film Barry Lyndon and it appeared in the 1995 mini-series The Buccaneers.

In 2003, a Time Team episode tried to discover traces of the old settlement of Henderskelf that had been demolished to make way for the castle. It was also used for the 2006 film Garfield: A Tail of Two Kitties.

Rooms (Great Hall Entrance, Turquoise Drawing Room) were used for indoor scenes in the 2013 TV series Death Comes to Pemberley. The castle and its grounds were used as the setting for the 2015 Bollywood film Shaandar and in the 2016 ITV series Victoria. The castle and mausoleum were used as the setting for the video for the 2018 Arctic Monkeys song "Four Out of Five".

The castle was used as the setting for Clyvedon House, the family seat of the Duke of Hastings, in the Netflix series Bridgerton (2020).

Gallery

See also 
Hampton National Historic Site, an 18th-century US mansion said to have been inspired by Castle Howard.
 Castle Howard railway station
 A more detailed architectural appraisal of Castle Howard is at John Vanbrugh.
 List of Baroque residences

References

External links

Houses completed in 1712
English Baroque architecture
English gardens in English Landscape Garden style
Gardens in North Yorkshire
Grade I listed buildings in North Yorkshire
Grade I listed houses
Country houses in North Yorkshire
+
John Vanbrugh buildings
Nicholas Hawksmoor buildings
Museums in North Yorkshire
Historic house museums in North Yorkshire
Arboreta in England
Woodland gardens